Jana Franziska Poll (born 7 May 1988 in Meppen, West Germany) is a German volleyball player, member of the Germany women's national volleyball team. At club level, she plays for German Allianz MTV Stuttgart.

National team career 
Poll made her first appearances with Germany women's national volleyball team in 2013. She was part of the German national team who won the gold medal at the 2013 Women's European Volleyball League in Bulgaria and the silver medal at the 2013 Women's European Volleyball Championship in Germany & Switzerland. In 2016, she participated in the 2016 FIVB Volleyball World Grand Prix.

Career 
After several years in the German League without winning any title, in the summer of 2016 Jana Franziska Poll traveled to Greece, signing with the historic club Panathinaikos Athens, where she remained for one year.

In July 2017 she made a contract with Greek powerhouse Olympiacos S.F. Piraeus. In 2017–18 season, Poll won both Hellenic competitions with the red-whites of Piraeus: the Hellenic Championship and the Hellenic Cup as well. Although, undoubtedly her bigger achievement was the title of the 2018 CEV Women's Challenge Cup. In that competition Jana Franziska Poll was nominated as 2nd best scorer and 2nd best attacker with 149 points and 119 points respectively.

In the summer of 2018 Poll returned to Germany for family reasons, making a contract with Allianz MTV Stuttgart, accepting the invitation of Yannis Athanassopoulos, the Greek coach of the Stuttgart club.

During the 2018–19 season, she became German Champion with Stuttgart in the Deutsche Volleyball-Bundesliga and reached the quarter finals of the CEV Women's Champions League. At the end of the season, she wanted to leave Stuttgart and envisioned returning to the Ladies in Black in Aachen to be closer to her husband. Shortly after signing, Aachen had to step back from the contract due to the club's financial troubles. She then switched to the new entry in Italy's first league, VolAlto Caserta.

Sporting achievements

National Team
 2013  Women's European Volleyball League (Varna, Bulgaria)
 2013  Women's European Volleyball Championship (Germany / Switzerland)

Clubs

International competitions
 2018  CEV Women's Challenge Cup, with Olympiacos S.F. Piraeus
 2019 Quarter Finalists in CEV Women's Champions League, with Allianz MTV Stuttgart

National championships
 2017/2018  Hellenic Championship, with Olympiacos Piraeus
 2018/2019  German Women's Championship, with Allianz MTV Stuttgart

National trophies
 2017/2018  Hellenic Cup, with Olympiacos S.F. Piraeus
 2018/2019  , with Allianz MTV Stuttgart

References

External links 

 Jana Franziska Poll Profile at www.volleyball-verband.de (in German)
 Jana Franziska Poll profile at FIVB.com
 profile at CEV web site at cev.eu
 profile at greekvolley.gr 

1988 births
Living people
German women's volleyball players
Panathinaikos Women's Volleyball players
Olympiacos Women's Volleyball players
German expatriates in Greece
People from Meppen
Sportspeople from Lower Saxony